The Isle of Man Football League is the senior football league on the Isle of Man and is run by the Isle of Man Football Association. Although the league is affiliated with The Football Association, it does not form a part of the English football league system.

History
The league's representative XI has won the FA Inter-League Cup on two occasions. In 2006 they beat the Cambridgeshire County League XI and qualified for the 2007 UEFA Regions' Cup, being eliminated in the group stage in Czech Republic. They won the Inter-League Cup again in 2013, but again were eliminated in the group stage of the Regions Cup, this time in Slovakia.

Competition format

Competition 
There are 26 clubs in the Isle of Man Football League which are grouped into two divisions: Premier League and Division Two. Each division has 13 clubs and in any given season a club plays each of the others in the same division twice (a double round-robin system), once at their home and once at that of their opponents. This makes for a total of 24 games played each season. Clubs gain three points for a win, one for a draw and none for a defeat. Clubs are ranked by total points, then goal difference, and then goals scored.

Promotion and relegation 
A system of promotion and relegation exists between the Premier League and Division Two. At the end of each season the two lowest placed clubs in the Premier League are relegated to Division two, and the top two placed clubs from Division Two are promoted to the Premier League. Each club has a second team in either Combination Division One or Combination Division Two. Promotion and relegation within the combination league is decided by the movement of each club’s first team.

Member clubs

The league lined up with the following clubs for the 2022–23 season.

Premier League
Ayre United
Corinthians
Douglas HSOB
Douglas Royal
Laxey
Marown
Onchan
Peel
Ramsey
Rushen United
St Johns United
St Georges
Union Mills

Division Two
Braddan
Castletown Metropolitan
Colby
Douglas and District
Douglas Athletic
Foxdale
Governors Athletic
Gymnasium
Michael United
Ramsey YCOB
St Marys

Defunct clubs
 Douglas Wanderers
 Malew
 Northern Athletic A.F.C. (withdrew from season 2010–2011)
 Pulrose United
 Ronaldsway A.F.C. (withdrew from season 2014–2015)

Past league winners

1896-2007

2007-present 
In 2007, Division One was renamed the Premier League. Division Two remained unchanged.

Titles by club

See also 
 List of association football competitions
 F.C. Isle of Man: a club playing in the English league system

References

External links
Results Website

 
Football competitions in the Isle of Man
Sports leagues established in 1896
Man